Johan(nes) Abraham Bierens de Haan (March 17, 1883 – June 13, 1958) was a Dutch biologist and ethologist.

He was born in Haarlem, and died in Siena, Italy.

1883 births
1958 deaths
Ethologists
Scientists from Haarlem
20th-century Dutch zoologists